Qeshlaq-e Ayan Ali Samad (also Romanized as Qeshlāq-e Ayan Alī Şamad) is a village in Qeshlaq-e Jonubi Rural District, Qeshlaq Dasht District, Bileh Savar County, Ardabil Province, Iran. At the 2006 census, its population was 55, in 12 families.

References 

Towns and villages in Bileh Savar County